In Greek mythology, Piras (Ancient Greek: Πείραντα) was a king of Argos. Otherwise, he was also known as Piren, Peiren, Peiras (Πειράς), Peirasus (Πείρασος) and Piranthus.

Family 
Piras was the son of Argus and Evadne, daughter of river god Strymon while his brothers were, Ecbasus, Tiryns, Epidaurus, Criasus and according to some, Phorbas also. Piras's wife was Callirrhoe who mothered his sons, Argus, Arestorides and Triopas. According to Hesiod and Acusilaus, Peiren was Io's father while Eusebius mentioned Callithyia as the daughter of Peiranthus. Io may be therefore identical to Callithyia as suggested by Hesychius of Alexandria.

Reign 
Peiras was credited with the founding of the first temple of Hera in Argolis and appointed his own daughter Callithyia as the priestess. Of the statues of Hera, which Pausanias saw in the Heraeum near Mycenae, the most ancient was one made of the wild pear-tree from the wood about Tiryns, which Peirasus was said to have dedicated for the sanctuary. The Argives, when they took that city, transferred the carved image of the goddess to the Heraeum. The account of Pausanias and the mythographers, however, does not represent Peirasus as the artist of this image, as some modern writers suppose, but as the king who dedicated it.

Peiras succeeded his father Argus while his son Triopas in turn followed him on the throne.

Notes

References 
 Apollodorus, The Library with an English Translation by Sir James George Frazer, F.B.A., F.R.S. in 2 Volumes, Cambridge, MA, Harvard University Press; London, William Heinemann Ltd. 1921. ISBN 0-674-99135-4. Online version at the Perseus Digital Library. Greek text available from the same website.
 Eusebius. Preparation of the Gospels. Translated by the Rev. Edwin Hamilton Gifford (1820-1905), edition of 1903.
Gaius Julius Hyginus, Fabulae from The Myths of Hyginus translated and edited by Mary Grant. University of Kansas Publications in Humanistic Studies. Online version at the Topos Text Project.
Pausanias, Description of Greece with an English Translation by W.H.S. Jones, Litt.D., and H.A. Ormerod, M.A., in 4 Volumes. Cambridge, MA, Harvard University Press; London, William Heinemann Ltd. 1918. . Online version at the Perseus Digital Library
Pausanias, Graeciae Descriptio. 3 vols. Leipzig, Teubner. 1903.  Greek text available at the Perseus Digital Library.
William Smith. A Dictionary of Greek and Roman biography and mythology. s.v. Peiranthus, Peirasus and Peiren. London (1873).

Princes in Greek mythology
Kings of Argos
Kings in Greek mythology
Inachids
Mythology of Argos